Michael William Alexander Espy (born November 29, 1982 in Jackson, Mississippi) is a former American football wide receiver.  He was originally signed by the Washington Redskins as an undrafted free agent in 2006.  He played college football at Mississippi.

Espy's namesake father is a well-known politician and was the United States Secretary of Agriculture under the Clinton Administration.

External links
Washington Redskins bio

1982 births
Living people
Players of American football from Jackson, Mississippi
American football wide receivers
Ole Miss Rebels football players
Washington Redskins players